Christopher Francis Freiling is a mathematician responsible for Freiling's axiom of symmetry in set theory. He has also made significant contributions to coding theory, in the process establishing connections between that field and matroid theory.

Freiling obtained his Ph.D. in 1981 from the University of California, Los Angeles under the supervision of Donald A. Martin. He is a member of the faculty of the Department of Mathematics at California State University, San Bernardino.

Selected publications

.
.

References

External links
 Home page

20th-century American mathematicians
21st-century American mathematicians
Set theorists
Coding theorists
University of California, Los Angeles alumni
California State University, San Bernardino faculty
Living people
Year of birth missing (living people)